Voices All is an album by Art Farmer and Benny Golson's group, The Jazztet recorded in Tokyo in 1983 and originally released on the Japanese Eastworld label.

Reception

Allmusic awarded the album 3 stars.

Track listing
All compositions by Benny Golson except as indicated
 "Whisper Not" - 6:12  
 "Voices All" - 7:48  
 "Killer Joe" - 7:43  
 "Mox Nix" (Art Farmer) - 6:15  
 "I Remember Clifford" - 5:31  
 "Evermore" - 6:43  
 "Park Avenue Petite" - 4:29

Personnel
Art Farmer - flugelhorn, trumpet
Benny Golson - tenor saxophone
Curtis Fuller - trombone
Cedar Walton - piano
Buster Williams - bass 
Albert Heath - drums

References 

Art Farmer albums
Benny Golson albums
1983 albums